Carlow railway station serves the town of Carlow in County Carlow.

It is a station on the Dublin to Waterford intercity route. The station has two platforms. The far-side platform is only used when two trains are in the station at once, as it is not accessible other than by footbridge. The station has a café.

History
The station opened on 4 August 1846 and was closed for goods traffic on 9 June 1976.

See also 
 List of railway stations in Ireland

References

External links
Irish Rail Carlow Station Website
Café at station

Buildings and structures in Carlow (town)
Iarnród Éireann stations in County Carlow
Railway stations in County Carlow
Railway stations opened in 1846
1846 establishments in Ireland
Railway stations in the Republic of Ireland opened in 1846